Entomology, the scientific study of insects and closely related terrestrial arthropods, has been impelled by the necessity of societies to protect themselves from insect-borne diseases, crop losses to pest insects, and insect-related discomfort, as well as by people's natural curiosity. This timeline article traces the history of entomology.

Timelines of entomology 
Timeline of entomology - prior to 1800
Timeline of entomology - 1800-1850
Timeline of entomology - 1850-1900
Timeline of entomology - post 1900

History of classification 

Many different classifications were proposed by early entomologists. It is important to realise that whilst many early names survive, they may be at different levels in the phylogenetic hierarchy. For instance, many families were first published as genera, as for example the genus Mymar, proposed by Alexander Henry Haliday in 1829, is now represented by the family Mymaridae.

History of forensic entomology 

Please see the History of forensic entomology page for more information on this subject.

See also
European and American voyages of scientific exploration
List of natural history dealers

References

Carpenter, Mathilde M., 1945 Bibliography of Biographies of Entomologists The American Midland Naturalist:33 No. 1 
Carpenter, Mathilde M., 1953. Bibliography of Biographies of Entomologists (Supplement) American Midland Naturalist:50, No. 2 :257-348.
Chou Io, 1990. A history of Chinese entomology. translated by Wang Siming revised by Chou Io, Lu Kinsheng & Kang Shusen
Derksen, W. Scheiding-Göllner, U. 1965–1975. Index litteraturae entomologicae. Serie II: Die Welt-Literatur über die gesamte Entomologie von 1864 bis 1900. 5 vols. Deutsche Akademie der Landwirtschaftswissenschaften, Berlin
Gaedike, R. 1985. Berichtigungen und Ergänzungen zu P. Gilbert: A compendium of biographical literature on deceased entomologists. Beitr. Ent. 35: 368–408.
Gilbert, P. 1977. A compendium of the biographical literature on deceased entomologists. Xiv + 455 pp. British Museum (Natural History), London 
Hagen, H. A. 1862–1866. Bibliotheca entomologica. Die Litteratur über das ganze Gebiet der Entomologie bis zum Jahre 1862. 2 vols. W. Engelmann, Leipzig.
Horn, W. & Schenkling, S. 1928–1929. Index litteraturae entomologicae. Serie: Die Welt-Literatur uber die gesamte Entomologie bis inklusive 1863. 4 vols. W. Horn, Berlin-Dahlem.
Musgrave, A. 1932. Bibliography of Australian Entomology 1775-1930 with biographical notes on authors and collectors. R. Zool. Soc. New South Wales, viii + 380 pp.
Nissen, C. 1966-1969  Die zoologische Buchillustration. Ihre Bibliographie und Geschichte.Stuttgart, Anton Hiersemann, 8 Lief., 1–666. Bibliographical reference work of the illustrated zoological rom antiquity to the 20th century
Sherborn, C. D. & Woodward, B. B. 1901. Notes on the dates of publication of the natural history portions of some French voyages. — Part I. 'Amérique méridionale'; 'Indes orientales': 'Pôle Sud' ('Astrolabe' and 'Zélée'); 'La Bonite'; 'La Coquille'; and 'L'Uranie et Physicienne'. Annals and Magazine of Natural History 7 7: 388–392 
[Soulsby, B. H.] 1933. A catalogue of the works of Linnaeus and publications more immediately relating thereto preserved in the libraries of the British Museum (Bloomsbury) and the British Museum(Natural History) (South Kensington). 2nd ed. xii + 246 + 68 pp. British Museum, London.
Stafleu, F. A. & Cowan, R. S. 1976–1988. Taxonomic Literature.A selective guide to botanical publications and collections with dates, commentaries and types. 2nd Edition. Vol. 1: A-G, xl+ 1136 pp. (1976); II: H-Le, xviii + 991 pp. (1979); III:Lh-O, xii + 980 pp. (1981); IV: P-Sak, ix + 1214 pp. (1983); V: Sal-Ste, [vi +] 1066 pp. (1985); VI: Sti-Vuy, [vi +] 926 pp. (1986); VII: W-Z, lvi + 653 pp. (1988). Bohn, Scheltema & Holkema, Utrecht.

External links
Kluge Early Classifications
Voyages of Exploration
Insects and Military History
Development of Dipterology in Czechoslovakia
Brief History of Forensic Entomology- Mark Benecke
The Emergence of French Medical Entomology
Browse books in the Missouri Botanic Gardens library
Historic Moth illustrations
History of the Lepidoptera collection USNM
History of expeditions to Papua New Guinea
 History of Russian Entomological Society
Victorian interest in Natural History NCSU 
Belle Epoque insects
Herbals and Insects 
Citational Author Index
A History of the Ecological Sciences Frank Egerton
 Smithsonian Institution Archives Systematic Entomology Laboratory, Photographs and Biographical Information,1797-1988.
Followers of Lamarck
History of Natural History In French
Voyages of Exploration In French
NCSU Famous entomologists on postage stamps
WUR Historic entomology online.
 Dates of Lepidoptera literature
Wikisource de Digitised entomological literature
Index Novus Litteraturae Entomologicae Bibliography of the literature on entomology from the beginning until 1863
 GDZ Library of the University of Göttingen digitised early literature Zoologica
Yves Bousquet Litteratura Coleopterologica (1758–1900): a guide to selected books related to the taxonomy of Coleoptera with publication dates and notes Zookeys. 2016; (583): 1–776. Published online 2016 Apr 25. doi:  10.3897/zookeys.583.7084

Entomology
Entomology
History of zoology